Brisbane City Council (BCC) is the democratic executive local government authority for the City of Brisbane, the capital city of the state of Queensland, Australia. The largest City Council in Australia by population and area, BCC's jurisdiction includes 26 wards and 27 elected councillors covering . BCC is overseen by the Lord Mayor of Brisbane, Adrian Schrinner, and the Council of Brisbane (all councillors of the City of Brisbane) and the Civic Cabinet (Councillors that chair one of eight standing committees within BCC). The Council's CEO is Colin Jensen, supported by EO Ainsley Gold.

Strategy 
Brisbane City Council is guided by two core future planning documents: Brisbane's Future Blueprint (infrastructure, cultural, and capital works projects), and Brisbane Vision 2031 (corporate and city planning). Council also does more frequent but smaller scale community consultations through the Your City Your Say platform.

Brisbane Future Blueprint 
Brisbane's Future Blueprint is a community-developed document, released in June 2018, outlining what the City Council's goals should be. One in five households in Brisbane, representing every suburb, responded to the community consultation, totalling over 100,000 responses. More than 15,000 unique suggestions to improve Brisbane were put forward. The Blueprint provides for eight principles and 40 specific actions to make Brisbane a "friendly and liveable city":

 Create a city of neighbourhoods
 Protect and create greenspace
 Create more to see and do
 Protect the Brisbane backyard and our unique character
 Ensure best practice design that complements the character of Brisbane
 Empower and engage residents
 Get people home quicker and safer with more travel options
 Give people more choice when it comes to housing

Brisbane Vision 2031 
Brisbane Vision 2031 is the City Council's long-term plan for developing Brisbane City. It outlines an additional eight principles to consider in developing Council policy and supplements the City Council's Corporate Plan 2016-17 and 2020-21.

Structure

Lord Mayor

The Lord Mayor of Brisbane holds a role as the Chief "Elected" Executive of the Brisbane City Council, parallel to the role of the Chief Executive Officer, which is held by a civilian employee of the Council. The Lord Mayor has a four-year term between elections, coinciding with general councillor elections. The current Lord Mayor of Brisbane is Adrian Schrinner of the Liberal National Party, supported by Krista Adams, the Deputy Mayor.

Council of Brisbane

The Council of Brisbane is the high-level administrative board of Brisbane City Council, composed of all elected councillors in the City of Brisbane. There are 27 councillors, 26 from electoral wards in Brisbane and the Lord Mayor.

Ordinary meetings of the Council are held in the City Hall Council Chamber, 64 Adelaide Street, Brisbane. Meetings are on Tuesdays at 1pm (except during recess periods).

The Chair of Council, elected by the Councillors, presides over each meeting. The Lord Mayor does not chair the proceedings. The current Chair of Council is the Councillor David McLachlan.

Standing Committees 
Brisbane City Council has ten Standing Committees made up of and chaired by elected representatives. Each committee considers Council policies, provides advice to Council and delivers results for the people of Brisbane. This includes a wide range of areas such as infrastructure, public transport and the environment. With the exception of the Establishment and Coordination Committee (also known as Civic Cabinet), the public are welcome to attend Council and standing committee meetings. 

Since August 2021, the standing committees of Council include: 

 Establishment and Coordination Committee (Civic Cabinet)
 City Planning and Suburban Renewal
 City Standards Committee
 Community, Arts and Nighttime Economy Committee
 Councillor Ethics Committee
 Economic Development and the Brisbane 2032 Olympic and Paralympic Games Committee
 Environment, Parks and Sustainability Committee
 Finance and City Governance Committee
 Infrastructure Committee
 Transport Committee

Most standing committee meetings are held on Tuesday mornings while Council is in session.

Civic Cabinet 
The Chair of each Standing Committee is also a member of Council’s Establishment and Coordination Committee, more commonly known as Civic Cabinet. At its highest level, Civic Cabinet sets the strategic direction for Brisbane as a city and Council as an organisation. The Civic Cabinet has been delegated significant responsibility by full Council. Civic Cabinet meets weekly to discuss policies and strategies in areas such as major projects, finance, urban planning, transport, environment, community services and city businesses. 

It is in this way that Civic Cabinet sets the strategic direction for Brisbane as a city and for Brisbane City Council as an organisation. The members of Civic Cabinet review and make recommendations to full Council on major plans such as Council's vision, City Plan, corporate documents and city finances.

Members of Civic Cabinet 
The following Councillors were appointed members of Civic Cabinet in August 2021: 
 Lord Mayor, Councillor Adrian Schrinner, City Treasurer and Chair of Civic Cabinet
 Deputy Mayor, Councillor Krista Adams, Civic Cabinet Chair for Economic Development and the Brisbane 2023 Olympic and Paralympic Games
 Councillor Adam Allan, Civic Cabinet Chair for City Planning and Suburban Renewal, Chair of the Councillor Ethics Committee
 Councillor Fiona Cunningham, Civic Cabinet Chair for Finance and City Governance
 Councillor Tracy Davis, Civic Cabinet Chair for Environment, Parks and Sustainability
 Councillor Vicki Howard, Civic Cabinet Chair for Community, Arts and Nighttime Economy
 Councillor Kim Marx, Civic Cabinet Chair for City Standards
 Councillor Ryan Murphy, Civic Cabinet Chair for Transport
 Councillor Andrew Wines, Civic Cabinet Chair for Infrastructure

The Lord Mayor is the Chair of Civic Cabinet. The Chief Executive Officer (CEO) acts as secretary of E&C, provides executive advice and reports back to Council as an organisation.

Each Civic Cabinet Chair works alongside its relevant organisational divisions to "consider Council policy, provide advice to Council and delivers results for the people of Brisbane."

Organisational divisions
Within Brisbane City Council, there are six different organisational divisions representing the core tasks of the Council. Each division had its own Divisional Manager, who is accountable to the Council of Brisbane, the Civil Cabinet, and the CEO. As of February 2023, the six divisions and their divisional managers are:

 City Administration and Governance - Tim Wright
 Organisational Services - Anne Lenz
 City Planning and Sustainability - David Chick
 Lifestyle and Community Services - Tash Tobias
 Transport for Brisbane - Geoffrey Beck
 Brisbane Infrastructure - Scott Stewart

These divisions are organisational, meaning that they're not subject to the changes in the elected administration nor are elected themselves.

Current composition

History

Pre-1900s 
 1823: John Oxley names the Brisbane River after Sir Thomas Brisbane, Governor of New South Wales from 1821 to 1825.
1842–1880: Civilians start occupying Brisbane, making it the main site of commerce for the region.
3 October 1859: The first elections for the Mayor of Brisbane are held, following the declaration of Brisbane as a local government municipality named after the river on which it sits. John Petrie was unanimously elected out of 37 candidates.

1900s 
 1924: The Parliament of Queensland passes the City of Brisbane Act, creating a single City Council for all the City of Brisbane, rather than the previous 20 various authorities and boards.
 1 October 1925: The new City Council is begins operation, under its first Mayor of Brisbane, William Jolly.
 8 April 1930: Governor of Queensland, John Goodwin officially opens the Brisbane City Hall.
1939: Brisbane is made the headquarters of Allies of World War II in the South Pacific for Australian and American service personnel. The original offices are now part of the MacArthur Chambers.
1982: Brisbane hosts the Commonwealth Games.
1988: Brisbane hosts Expo 88, giving birth to South Bank Parklands, the now central cultural area of Brisbane and home of the Brisbane City Council head office.

2000s 
 1 July 2010: The Legislative Assembly of Queensland passes the City of Brisbane Act 2010 as part of a state-wide review of local government legislation, formalising and consolidating state legislation about the City of Brisbane.
 2010-2013: Brisbane City Hall reopens after significant restoration and renovation.
November 2014: Brisbane hosts the G20 Leaders Summit.

See also 

 List of mayors and lord mayors of Brisbane
 City of Brisbane

References

Notes

External links 
 

City of Brisbane
City councils
1924 establishments in Australia
Local government in Queensland